Venkatapur is a village in Medchal-Malkajgiri District in Telangana, India. It falls under Ghatkesar mandal.

References

Villages in Ranga Reddy district